The Virginia Blue Ridge Railway (VBR) is a historic intrastate short line railroad that operated in central Virginia in the 20th century.

History
The company was incorporated in 1914, and construction was started in 1915. The VBR extended from Tye River Depot in Nelson County, where it interchanged with the Southern Railway, to Massies Mill. The railroad followed the course of the Tye and Piney Rivers for several miles before entering the mountains. It was initially built to haul chestnut for lumber out of the heavily-timbered Piney River area to local mills until World War I. The chestnut blight  wiped out much of the timbered areas. However, the railroad later served several quarries in the area where titanium dioxide and aplite were mined. It passed through the communities of Roses Mill, Piney River, Canopy, Lowesville, and Buffalo Mine. Steam operations on the VBR ended on August 1, 1963 with ex-U.S. Army 0-6-0 #9 being the honor of pulling the last steam powered freight train.

The line was abandoned in 1981. In the early 21st century, part of the roadbed was being developed as a rails-to-trails project, the Blue Ridge Railway Trail.

Locomotives

This is the locomotive roster of the Virginia Blue Ridge Railway.

References 

 Brief history and information on the trail project
 Brief history and some photos

Defunct Virginia railroads
Railway companies established in 1914
Railway companies disestablished in 1980
American companies disestablished in 1980
American companies established in 1914